Amarat Aslan  is a Syrian village located in the Hama Subdistrict of the Hama District in the Hama Governorate. According to the Syria Central Bureau of Statistics (CBS), Amarat Aslan had a population of 746 in the 2004 census.

References 

Populated places in Hama District